Dr. Miles Medical Co. v. John D. Park & Sons Co., (220 U.S. 373) (1911), was a United States Supreme Court case on anti-trust grounds that ruled that resale price maintenance, a form of vertical restraint, is illegal per se.

The Dr. Miles Medical Co. (Dr. Miles), now Miles Laboratories, was founded in 1884. In an era when most products were snake oil, Dr. Miles invented a patent medicine that had an actually useful, if somewhat toxic, active ingredient: bromides.

John D. Park & Sons Co. (Park & Sons) was a discount drug reseller that sought to profit off the advertising of Dr. Miles' remedies while selling Dr. Miles products at rock bottom prices. While lower prices drove sales for Park & Sons, it cut into the profits of Dr. Miles. To fix this, Dr. Miles made an agreement with all sellers of its products that they would be required to sell the products at a minimum price.

References 

United States antitrust case law
1911 in United States case law
Anti-competitive practices
United States Supreme Court cases
United States Supreme Court cases of the White Court